Əhmədli may refer to:

Places in Azerbaijan
Əhmədli, Baku
Ahmedli (Baku Metro), a railway station
Əhmədli, Beylagan
Əhmədli (40° 28' N 46° 09' E), Dashkasan
Əhmədli (40° 31' N 45° 54' E), Dashkasan
Əhmədli, Lachin
Əhmədli, Masally
Əhmədli, Shamakhi
Əhmədli, Shamkir

Other uses
Ahmedli (ship), earlier Empire Teguda, a Polish-built Soviet coastal tanker 1990–2002